is a Japanese professional wrestler and former mixed martial artist working for various Japanese professional wrestling promotions such as DDT Pro-Wrestling (DDT) and Apache Pro-Wrestling Army.

Professional wrestling career

Incependent circuit (1997–present)
Ichimiya made his professional wrestling debut at WAR 5th Anniversary of WAR & 10th Anniversary of the Tenryu Revolution, an event produced by Wrestler Association-R on July 6, 1997, where he teamed up with Shigeo Okumura and Tomohiro Ishii to defeat Masaaki Mochizuki, Takashi Okamura and Yoshikazu Taru in a six-man tag team match. On March 6, 1998, he competed at IWA Japan FUTURE TRIAL TOUR’98, an event produced by International Wrestling Association of Japan, where he teamed up with Tomohiro Ishii in a losing effort to Keisuke Yamada and Takeshi Sato. On January 25, 2003, Ichimiya teamed up with Masao Orihara, Mr. Pogo, Ofune and Goemon in a losing effort to Mitsuhiro Matsunaga, Mr. Gannosuke, Kazuya Yuasa, Command Bolshoi and Bad Boy Hido in a ten-person tag team match which took place at Battle Decisive East vs. West, a freelance event. His last known match was at All Japan Pro Wrestling's Suwamachi Revitalization Vol. 9 event from October 30, 2016, where he defeated Fuminori Abe under the name of Ichiba Shin "Ichi".

Dramatic Dream Team/DDT Pro Wrestling (2002–present)
Ichimiya is a former KO-D Tag Team Champion, title which he won at DDT Max Bump 2003 on May 18, by teaming up with Seiya Morohashi to defeat Super Uchuu Power and Takashi Sasaki in a tournament final for the vacant titles. Ichimiya participated in a 14-person battle royal for the Ironman Heavymetalweight Championship, appearing two times under the ring name of Giru Nakano and Keigi Mutoh parodies of the real wrestlers Bull Nakano and Keiji Mutoh, competing against many popular wrestling figures such as the winner Toru Owashi, Michael Nakazawa, Riho and Yumiko Hotta at Ryōgoku Peter Pan 2009 on August 23. He won the KO-D Openweight Championship at DDT Dead Or Alive 2003 on October 26 by defeating Takashi Sasaki in a chain deathmatch.

Professional wrestling persona
Throughout his career, Ichimiya has used many ring names that were parodies of real wrestlers. Those names were usually based on word play and included the kanji  (gi), meaning "fake". Once romanized, some of those names can be indistinguishable from the real names. Those ring names included:

Mixed martial arts career
Ichimiya debuted as a mixed martial artist as a heavyweight at Deep: 6th Impact , on September 7, 2002, falling short to Kazuki Okubo by way of armbar. At Deep: 7th Impact, he scored the first draw of his career against Azteca. Hos last known contest was a loss against Hidehisa Matsuda by way of a rear-naked choke at Deep: 10th Impact  from June 25, 2003. His final record of the career was (0-2-1).

Mixed martial arts record

|-
|Loss
|align=center|0–2–1
|Hidehisa Matsuda
|Technical Submission (rear-naked choke)
|Deep: 10th Impact 
|
|align=center|1
|align=center|3:39
|Tokyo, Japan
|
|-
|Draw
|align=center|
|Azteca
|Draw (unanimous)
|Deep: 7th Impact 
|
|align=center|3
|align=center|5:00
|Tokyo, Japan
|
|-
|Loss
|align=center|0–1
|Kazuki Okubo
|Submission (armbar)
|Deep: 6th Impact 
|
|align=center|1
|align=center|2:41
|Tokyo, Japan
|

Championships and accomplishments
Apache Pro-Wrestling Army
WEW World Tag Team Championship (1 time) – with Tomohiko Hashimoto
Dramatic Dream Team/DDT Pro-Wrestling
Ironman Heavymetalweight Championship (20 times)
KO-D Openweight Championship (1 time)
KO-D Tag Team Championship (1 time) – with Seiya Morohashi

GWC 6-Man Tag Team Championship (1 time) – with Daisuke and Yuri Urai
International Wrestling Association of Japan
IWA World Tag Team Championship (1 time) – with Jun Izumida

References 

1969 births
Living people
Japanese male professional wrestlers
20th-century professional wrestlers
21st-century professional wrestlers
Ironman Heavymetalweight Champions
KO-D Tag Team Champions
KO-D Openweight Champions